David F. Mains (September 14, 1874 – September 2, 1949) was a member of the Wisconsin State Assembly.

Biography
Mains was born on September 14, 1874. Sources have differed on the location. From 1896 to 1900, he was a schoolteacher. He died at his home in Eugene, Oregon on September 2, 1949.

Political career
Mains was elected to the Assembly in 1906 and 1908. Other positions he held include town clerk of Clinton, Vernon County, Wisconsin. He was a Republican.

References

Republican Party members of the Wisconsin State Assembly
City and town clerks
Schoolteachers from Wisconsin
1874 births
1949 deaths